Governor Hodgson may refer to:

Frederick Mitchell Hodgson (1851–1928), Governor of the Gold Coast from 1898 to 1900, Governor of Barbados from 1900 to 1904, and Governor of British Guiana from 1904 to 1911
John Hodgson (British Army officer) (1757–1846), Governor of Bermuda from 1806 to 1810

See also
Arnold Hodson (1881–1944), Governor of the Falkland Islands from 1926 to 1930, Governor of Sierra Leone from 1931 to 1934, and Governor of the Gold Coast from 1934 to 1941